James Copeland (1 May 1918 – 17 April 2002) was a Scottish actor.

His film work began in 1953, the year which saw him play the most prominent role of his movie career, that of Andy McGregor in the ensemble cast of Innocents in Paris. Other roles included Mackay in The Seekers (1954), the ship's mate in The Maggie (1954), Rockets Galore! (1958), a police constable (at a road block) in The 39 Steps (1959), Farewell Performance (1963), Torture Garden (1967), and the guide in The Private Life of Sherlock Holmes (1970).

He also appeared on TV as one of the first continuity announcers/newsreaders with Aberdeen-based station Grampian TV, from its inception in September 1961, he also played the Gond leader Selris in the Doctor Who story The Krotons, Captain Ogilvie in Operation Kilt, an early episode of Dad's Army, and the Scottish customer in Camping In, an episode of Are You Being Served?. He later played Jamie Stewart in Take the High Road from 1982 to 1987. He produced a collection of poetry entitled Some Work (Bramma, 1972) which included the much anthologised poem 'Black Friday'.

He had a son, James Cosmo, who is also an actor, and a daughter named Laura.

Filmography

References

External links

1918 births
2002 deaths
People from Helensburgh
Scottish male film actors
Scottish male television actors